Hypopyra ossigeroides is a moth of the family Erebidae. It is found on Borneo and Sumatra. The habitat consists of montane forests.

The wingspan is 38–43 mm.

References

Moths described in 2005
Hypopyra
Moths of Indonesia